The Law of the Ellipse, or Stodola's cone law, provides a method for calculating the highly nonlinear dependence of extraction pressures with a flow for multistage turbine with high backpressure, when the turbine nozzles are not choked. It is important in turbine off-design calculations.

Description 

We consider a multistage turbine, like in the picture. The design calculation is done for design flow rate (the flow expected for the most uptime).

Stodola established experimentally that the relationship between these three parameters represented in Cartesian coordinate system has the shape of a degenerate quadric surface, the cone directrix being an ellipse. For a constant initial pressure  the flow rate depends on the outlet pressure  as an arc of ellipse in a plane parallel to 

For very low outlet pressure , like for condensing turbines, flow rates do not change with the outlet pressure, but drops very quickly with the increase of the backpressure.

Usually, Stodola's cone do not represent absolute flow rates and pressures, but relative to the maximum flow rate and pressures, the maximum values of the diagram having in this case the value of 1.

If the speed of sound is reached in a stage, the group of stages can be analyzed till that stage, which is the last in the group, the remaining stages forming another group of analysis. This division is imposed by the stage working in limited (choked) mode. The cone is shifted in the  axis direction, appearing a triangular surface, depending on the critical pressure ratio , where  is the outlet critical pressure of the stage group.

The analytical expression of the flow ratio is:

For condensing turbine the ratio  is very low, previous relation reduces to:

simplified relationship obtained theoretically by Gustav Flügel (1885–1967).

In the event that the variation of inlet temperature is low, the relationship is simplified:

For condensing turbines , so in this case:

During operation, the above relations allow the assessment of the flow rate depending on the operating pressure of a stage.

References 
  Gavril Creța, Turbine cu abur și cu gaze [Steam and Gas Turbines], București: Ed. Didactică şi Pedagogică, 1981, 2nd ed. Ed. Tehnică, 1996, 
  Alexander Leyzerovich, Large Steam Power Turbines, Tulsa, Oklahoma: PennWell Publishing Co., 1997, Romanian version, București: Editura AGIR, 2003,

Further reading 
  Aurel Stodola, Die Dampfturbinen, Berlin: Springer Verlag, 1903–1924 (six editions)
 Aurel Stodola, Steam and Gas Turbines, New York: McGraw-Hill, 1927
  Constantin Zietemann, Die Dampfturbinen, 2nd ed., Berlin-Göttingen-Heidelberg: Springer-Verlag, 1955
 Walter Traupel, New general theory of multistage axial flow turbomachines. Translated by Dr. C.W. Smith, Washington D.C. Published by Navy Dept.
 Sydney Lawrence Dixon, Fluid Mechanics and Thermodynamics of Turbomachinery, Pergamon Press Ltd., 1966, 2nd ed. 1975, 3rd ed. 1978 (reprinted 1979, 1982 [twice], 1986, 1986, 1989, 1992, 1995), 4th ed. 1998

Notes

External links
 Modeling of Off-Design Multistage Turbine Pressures by Stodola's Ellipse 

Turbines
Jet engines
Power engineering